"Flashing Lights" is a song by American hip-hop artist Kanye West. It features Detroit R&B singer Dwele and contains background vocals from Australian singer Connie Mitchell. West co-wrote and co-produced the song with Eric Hudson and released it on November 12, 2007, as the fourth single for his third studio album, Graduation. The single's cover art was designed by Japanese pop artist Takashi Murakami. The single received acclaim from music critics upon release.

Background
West first unveiled "Flashing Lights" on August 27, 2007, at an album listening session for Graduation in New York City, where he played the song over a clip from the 2004 Hong Kong film 2046 which he later released on his official blog. The song features Detroit R&B singer Dwele on its chorus and contains additional vocals provided by Connie Mitchell of the Australian electronic group Sneaky Sound System. The collaboration came about when Kanye met Mitchell's bandmates Angus McDonald and Daimon Downey at a diner in Sydney, Australia. Seeking musical inspiration, West asked McDonald for ideas, who in turn suggested that he be introduced to Mitchell. After their meeting, West asked Mitchell to record vocals for the song, as well as certain other tracks on Graduation. Mitchell later admitted that while she previously didn't know who West was and never really cared for hip-hop, the collaboration had changed her views.

As a result of its popularity, "Flashing Lights" was utilized by multiple media outlets. In December 2007, the song was used in an ad campaign for French vodka Cîroc, featuring spokesperson Sean Combs. It is featured in the popular action-adventure video game Grand Theft Auto IV on the in-game contemporary hip-hop radio station, The Beat 102.7. The song came to be included on Now That's What I Call Music 27. In January 2009, "Flashing Lights" was used once again for the highly conceptualized promotional TV spots co-directed by Emnet Mulugeta and Marcus Engstrand of the upcoming part two of the fifth season Nip/Tuck. The promo  won gold at the North American Promax Awards. The song has been confirmed to be included within the setlist of the turntable music video game Scratch: The Ultimate DJ. The song appeared in one episode of the MTV series My Life as Liz.

Music structure and composition
"Flashing Lights" is an electronic-tinged hip-hop/R&B song composed in the key of F♯ minor. It is written in common time and moves at 90 beats per minute. The main and background vocal range for the song spans a tenth, from C4 to E5. Opening with a gradual, rising crescendo of symphonic strings before transforming into a moderately-paced, synth-driven beat, "Flashing Lights" tells the operatic narrative of man contemplating the complexities of a tragic relationship. After the introduction, in which Mitchell's processed vocals repeat the titular hook four times, West raps the two verses, each one followed by the chorus sung by Dwele coupled with the hook. Following a break, the song enters a passage where its heavily manipulated hook echoes in and out before the coda draws the composition to a close.

Critical reception
"Flashing Lights" received widespread acclaim from music critics and was widely regarded as one of the best songs on Graduation. Alex Fletcher of Digital Spy highly approved of the single, awarding it a four-star review and asserting that it "easily demonstrates why West is the hottest property in US music at the moment. Mixing chilled-out electronics, jittering synths and laid-back, old-skool hip-hop, he creates a sumptuous track that grows more intriguing with every listen." Billboard gave a favorable review, claiming that it "does a great job of reintroducing Miami Vice-esque keys." Rolling Stone also gave the song a positive review, stating that within it, "West single-handedly takes hip-hop back to its pre-Run-DMC disco days." PopMatters complimented "Flashing Lights" for its glitzy sound as well as its futuristic feel. Stylus Magazine music reviewer Jayson Greene heralded the "gorgeously airy" single as "one of the most unabashedly graceful things heard on a commercial hip-hop record in years."

"Flashing Lights" was listed as the 31st-best song of 2007 by Stylus Magazine. The song was also listed at number 13 on Pitchforks "The 100 Best Tracks of 2008". It was later cited as the 52nd best song of the entire decade by Pitchfork, which wrote, "It's classic Kanye-- self-possessed, superfluously art-ridden, probably too clever by half. In Kanye's post-everything museum, da Vinci sidles up next to a bust of Julius; a Karen O-repping blog post follows one dedicated to 10-ft. tall "Chewing Gum Sculptures"; Parisian house mingles with stadium hip-hop. 'But what do I know?' goes the hook, pop-pushing curiosity still intact." MTV named it the second best hip-hop single of 2008.

Chart performance
Fueled by the momentum of Graduations release, even before actually being released as a single, "Flashing Lights" entered the Billboard Bubbling Under R&B/Hip-Hop Singles chart at number 23 for the issue date of October 13, 2007. The next week, the song descended two spaces to the 25th position. Two weeks later, "Flashing Lights" rebounded and climbed up to peak at number twelve on the chart for the issue dated November 3. "Flashing Lights" debuted at number 61 on the Hot R&B/Hip-Hop Songs for the chart week of November 10, 2007. The next week, the song yielded a single space and moved down to number 61. However, it rebounded the following week and moved up to number 47 on the issue dated November 24. Over the course of the following five weeks, "Flashing Lights" climbed upwards on the chart before finally peaking at number twelve on the issue date of December 29. The song later reached this position again on the issue dated February 2, where it remained for two weeks in a row before relapsing. The song entered the Hot Rap Tracks chart at number 25 on the issue dated November 11, where it stayed for two weeks. By the issue dated December 29, the song had climbed up 20 spaces to reach the fifth position, where it remained for an additional three weeks. "Flashing Lights" peaked at number two on the chart for the issue date of January 26, 2008, where it stayed for two weeks in a row.

"Flashing Lights" first appeared on the Bubbling Under Hot 100 Singles chart at number 22 for the issue date of November 24, 2007. The next week, it climbed 19 places to reach its peak on the chart at number three. "Flashing Lights" was the "Hot Shot Debut" of the week on the Hot 100, debuting at number 75 on November 29. The next week, the single climbed up to number 57 for the issue date of December 15. In its third week on the chart, "Flashing Lights" moved up another seven spaces to reach number 50. The following week, it ascended eleven places to the 39th position for the issue dated December 29. The song moved up three spaces the week after to reach number 36. On the issue date of January 12, "Flashing Lights" fell 13 places to number 49. However, the single experienced a rebound the next week and ascended fourteen spaces to the 35th position. The song rose again the following week to reach number 30 for the issue dated January 26. "Flashing Lights" peaked at the number 29 spot on the Billboard Hot 100 on the issue date of February 2, 2008, making it the lowest peaking song in the 2008 Billboard Year-End.

In Canada, the song debuted at number 88 on the issue date of February 23, 2008. The next week, it climbed up to reach number 67. The following week, "Flashing Lights" moved up another seven spaces to peak at number 54 on the issue dated March 3. Despite only charting at number 29, in the UK, the song has remained successful and is played on the KISS network daily. The song's highest European chart performance occurred in Belgium, where it charted at number five for the issue date of April 12, 2008. On the issue date of May 3, "Flashing Lights" debuted and peaked at number 84 on the European Hot 100.

Music video
In total, three separate videos were made for "Flashing Lights" with the one aired on television being the third and final version. The third music video was first unveiled before an audience of two hundred guests at the Entertainment Weekly Grammy Award after-party on February 10, 2008. It was intended to premiere on BET on February 13, 2008, but was subsequently pulled from schedule. West decided to premiere the video on his official blog that same day. The video was co-directed by Spike Jonze along with West himself and produced by Jonathan Becker and Joshua Greenberg of Bucks Boys Productions. Filmed in January 2008 entirely in slow-motion, the video begins with a Ford Mustang Bullit rolling onto the screen and stopping at dusk in the desert outside Las Vegas, Nevada. As the bright, red taillights turn off, the song breaks into its titular refrain and Houston-based Playboy model Rita G. exits the vehicle dressed in a wig, fur coat and large black sunglasses. Walking a distance away from the car, she strips down to her lingerie and lights her clothes on fire. As she walks back towards the car with flames at her back, West's vocals begin. Kanye himself finally makes his appearance when the woman opens the trunk to reveal him lying in it tied up and gagged. She gently strokes his helpless, terrified face and gives him a light kiss, before retrieving a nearby shovel. As the camera dollies out, the woman raises the shovel over her head and repeatedly stabs it into the trunk. The video then abruptly cuts to the words "Flashing Lights" written red letters against a black screen before concluding over a minute earlier than the album version of the song.

The second video for the single leaked onto the internet on May 23, 2008. It casts UK model Charlotte Carter-Allen as a young woman who becomes overwhelmed by the New York City nightlife. Less than a week apart, the first music video shot for "Flashing Lights" was released on May 29. Directed by Martin de Thurah, filmed in Berlin, Germany and bearing resemblance to a murder-mystery tale, this version features West pursuing a mysterious woman wearing a couture gown played by American model Sessilee Lopez, along with multiple enigmatic characters under the roof of a haunted mansion. This version was listed at number two on the Viral Video Chart on May 30. Following the releases, West clarified on his blog he did not release the two videos. He had produced more than one version of the same video as is common practice and only selected the one he was the happiest with; the rest were leaked. The third video was voted as the eleventh best music video of 2008 by Rolling Stone. Pitchfork listed the same version as the fifteenth best music video of the decade. Slant Magazine named it the 17th best music video of the 2000s decade.

In August 2010, during an Ustream session, West admitted that "Flashing Lights" is his favorite music video that he has done so far in his career. In June 2015, French rapper Nekfeu takes inspiration in Kanye West for the music video of his song "Égérie", where he offers an epilogue of "Flashing Lights".

Live performances

After providing a surprise appearance at a concert held by Kid Sister in New York City's American Museum of Natural History on January 25, 2008, West remained onstage to perform "Can't Tell Me Nothing," "Good Life" and "Flashing Lights". It was there he also announced that he was set to premiere the music video for "Flashing Lights" in the coming weeks. He performed "Flashing Lights" live for the opening of Japanese artist Takashi Murakami's exhibit at the Brooklyn Museum on April 4. During the song's second verse, West playfully courted a woman sitting in the front row, holding her hand as he recited the lyrics.

West included "Flashing Lights" within the setlist of his Glow in the Dark Tour. In the space opera storyline of the conceptual concert, West attempts to harness the energy emitted by aliens that have taken on the form of the shooting stars mentioned in the song to power his "Spaceship" and make his escape from a planet devoid of creativity. However, the plan fails and the ship plummets from the sky, crashing back to the ground to the tune of "All Falls Down". Near the end of the tour's North American leg, West performed the song during the final night of Lollapalooza 2008 in August in his hometown of Chicago, where he co-headlined the festival with Nine Inch Nails.

In August, West also played "Flashing Lights" at the Exdo Event Center in Denver for a private show held for Bono's humanitarian organization ONE. During his performance, he produced a freestyle that included improvised lines touching on Democratic presidential candidate Barack Obama as well as his late mother. Kanye performed the song during his appearance at the Knitting Factory in New York City on September 9. West provided a live rendition of "Flashing Lights" during his appearance on VH1 Storytellers on February 28, 2009. "Flashing Lights" was performed at while West headlined the Met Gala on May 5, 2009.

Cover versions and remixes
The song was remixed by Canadian indie pop musician Colin Munroe, who retitled it "I Want Those Flashing Lights" and made his own music video. It eventually caught the attention of Kanye West, who expressed his affinity by posting its accompanying video directed by Philip Sportel up on his official blog. The official remix of "Flashing Lights" featured  R&B singer-songwriter R. Kelly. A HBCU Marching Band performed "Flashing Lights" at the Georgia Dome Battle of the Bands on January 26, 2008. Styles P released a freestyle over the instrumental. The song has been covered during live performances by Lorde.

Canadian nu-jazz band Badbadnotgood made an instrumental cover of the song. Italian jazz-rap Studio Murena produced a new version of the song adding lyrics to Badbadnotgood's cover.

Media usage

 It was featured in Grand Theft Auto IV, appearing on the in-game radio station The Beat 102.7.
 The song was used during a scene in the 2016 animated film Sing.
 "Flashing Lights" was featured in a 2010 Yahoo! commercial.
 In 2015, ABC used the song in a commercial for NBA Saturday Primetime. 
 It was used in a 2018 J'Adore television commercial starring Charlize Theron, titled: The New Absolu: The Film.
It was used in a 2019 J'Adore  television commercial, titled: Bath Ritual.

Track listingDigital single "Flashing Lights" – 3:57UK CD single "Flashing Lights" – 3:57
 "Stronger" (Andrew Dawson Remix) – 4:45UK 12" single'''
 "Flashing Lights" – 3:57 
 "Flashing Lights" (Instrumental) – 3:57
 "Stronger" (Andrew Dawson Remix) – 4:45

Personnel
Information taken from Graduation'' liner notes.
Songwriters: Kanye West and Eric Hudson
Producers: Kanye West and  Eric Hudson
Mix engineer: Andrew Dawson
Assistant engineers: Matty Green, Anthony Palazzole, Andy Marcinkowski
Violins: Emma Kummrow, Igor Szwec, Gloria Justen, Olga Konopelsky, Luigi Mazzocchi, Charles Parker
Violas: Peter Nocella and Alexandra Leem
Cello: Jennie Lorenzo
Bass: Tim Ressler
String arrangements: Larry Gold
Additional vocals: Connie Mitchell

Charts

Weekly charts

Year-end charts

Certifications

Release history

References

External links

"Flashing Lights" lyrics at MTV

2007 songs
2008 singles
Kanye West songs
Music videos directed by Kanye West
Music videos directed by Spike Jonze
Song recordings produced by Kanye West
Songs written by Kanye West
Roc-A-Fella Records singles
Songs written by Eric Hudson
Song recordings produced by Eric Hudson